The Shire of Northampton is a local government area in the Mid West region of Western Australia, about  north of Geraldton and about  north of the state capital, Perth.

The shire includes the former Principality of Hutt River, a now dissolved micronation which has no recognition by the state or federal governments.

History
The Mines Road District was constituted on 25 January 1871 under the Road Boards Act 1871. It was renamed the Northampton Road District  on 10 February 1887. On 1 July 1961, it became a shire following the passage of the Local Government Act 1960, which reformed all remaining road districts into shires.

Wards
The Shire is divided into six wards, most of which elect one councillor:

 Kalbarri Ward (four councillors)
 Central Ward (three councillors)
 Coastal Ward
 North East Ward
 South East Ward
 West Ward

Prior to May 2003, the Coastal Ward was known as the Horrocks Ward, the Kalbarri Ward had three councillors and all the others had two councillors.

Towns and localities
The towns and localities of the Shire of Northampton with population and size figures based on the most recent Australian census:

Population
The population of the Shire of Northampton as at the 2006 census was 3,204 (Usual Residents) or 4,085 (Place of Enumeration). The disparity is due to holiday accommodation in Kalbarri being picked up in the latter count.

Notable councillors
 Thomas Burges, Mines Road Board member 1871–1877, briefly chairman; later a colonial MP
 Samuel Mitchell, Mines Road Board member 1872–1879, chairman 1876–1879; later a colonial MP
 John Cunningham, Northampton Road Board member 1900s; later a state MP
 William Patrick, Northampton Road Board member 1918–1930; later a state MP
 Les Logan, Northampton Road Board member 1940–1945; later a state MP

Heritage-listed places

As of 2023, 223 places are heritage-listed in the Shire of Northampton, of which 30 are on the State Register of Heritage Places, among them the Lynton Convict Hiring Depot.

References

External links
 

 
Northampton